The Rybczynski theorem was developed in 1955 by the Polish-born English economist Tadeusz Rybczynski (1923–1998). It states that at constant relative goods prices, a rise in the endowment of one factor will lead to a more than proportional expansion of the output in the sector which uses that factor intensively, and an absolute decline of the output of the other good.

In the context of the Heckscher–Ohlin model of international trade, open trade between two regions often leads to changes in relative factor supplies between the regions. This can lead to an adjustment in the quantities and types of outputs between the two regions. The Rybczynski theorem explains the outcome from an increase in one of these factor's supply as well as the effect on the output of a good which depends on an opposing factor.

Eventually, across both countries, market forces would return the system toward equality of production in regard to input prices such as wages (the state of factor price equalization).

Relationship between endowments and outputs
The Rybczynski theorem displays how changes in an endowment affects the outputs of the goods when full employment is sustained. The theorem is useful in analyzing the effects of capital investment, immigration and emigration within the context of a Heckscher-Ohlin model. Consider the diagram below, depicting a labour constraint in red and a capital constraint in blue. Suppose production occurs initially on the production possibility frontier (PPF) at point A.

Suppose there is an increase in the labour endowment. This will cause an outward shift in the labour constraint. The PPF and thus production will shift to point B. Production of clothing, the labour-intensive good, will rise from C1 to C2. Production of cars, the capital-intensive good, will fall from S1 to S2.

If the endowment of capital rose the capital constraint would shift out causing an increase in car production and a decrease in clothing production. Since the labour constraint is steeper than the capital constraint, cars are capital-intensive and clothing is labor-intensive.

In general, an increase in a country's endowment of a factor will cause an increase in output of the good which uses that factor intensively, and a decrease in the output of the other good.

See also
Leontief paradox
Dutch disease

Further reading

Economics theorems
International trade theory